Ningerum is a small town on the Kiunga-Tabubil Highway, about equidistant between the two centres of Kiunga and Tabubil. Ningerum is the seat of the Ningerum Rural LLG, which was the second most populous LLG in the North Fly District of the Western Province of Papua New Guinea during the 2000 census. The town is served by Ningerum Airport.

The township itself has a population of roughly 5000 people, a few regional stores and an airport. The Ningerum is also the name for the people inhabiting this region who are noted for their therapeutic knowledge.

Climate
Ningerum has a very wet tropical rainforest climate (Af) with very heavy to extremely heavy rainfall year-round.

See also
Ningerum Rural LLG

References

Populated places in the Western Province (Papua New Guinea)